Tornado is the second studio album by The Rainmakers, produced by Terry Manning and released in 1987. It reached #116 on the Billboard 200.

A remastered version of the album was released in 2012 with 8 additional bonus tracks.

Track listing
All tracks written by Bob Walkenhorst except where noted.

 "Snakedance" – 4:02
 "Tornado of Love" – 4:15
 "The Wages of Sin" - 3:42
 "Small Circles" - 3:28
 "No Romance" - 3:35
 "One More Summer" - 3:34
 "The Lakeview Man" - 3:02
 "Rainmaker" - 4:29
 "I Talk With My Hands" - 6:33
 "The Other Side of the World" - 4:27

Bonus tracks on 2012 Remastered CD
 "Stick Together" - 4:43
 "Rockin' Around" (Steve Phillips) - 3:31
 "Stupid Way to Die" - 3:39
 "Small Circles" [acoustic] - 3:00
 "Task" - 4:14
 "He Yells at the Birds" - 3:48
 "My Days Are Numbered" - 3:22
 "Kisses from St. Louis" - 2:30

Personnel

The Rainmakers 
Bob Walkenhorst - lead vocals, guitars, keyboards
Rich Ruth - bass, vocals
Steve Phillips - lead guitars, vocals
Pat Tomek - drums

Additional musicians 
Terry Manning - keyboards

Charts

References 

1987 albums
Mercury Records albums
The Rainmakers (band) albums